Fan Leng Lau is a village in Fanling, in the North District of the New Territories of Hong Kong.

Administration
Fan Leng Lau is a recognized village under the New Territories Small House Policy. It is one of the villages represented within the Fanling District Rural Committee. For electoral purposes, Fan Leng Lau is part of the Fanling Town constituency, which is currently represented by Wong Hoi-ying.

History
Pang Kwei was the founding ancestor of the Pang Clan who went to Lung Shan, now known as Lung Yeuk Tau in Fanling from Dongguan, Guangzhou in mainland China in 1190. He then moved to Fan Leng Lau in 1220 and established a village there. As the population of the clan increased, they moved westward to settle in Fanling Wai and other places.

References

External links

 Delineation of area of existing village Fan Leng Lau (Fanling) for election of resident representative (2019 to 2022)
 Antiquities and Monuments Office. Hong Kong Traditional Chinese Architectural Information System. Fan Leng Lau

Villages in North District, Hong Kong
Fanling